Open Society Foundations (OSF), formerly the Open Society Institute, is a grantmaking network founded and chaired by business magnate George Soros. Open Society Foundations financially supports civil society groups around the world, with a stated aim of advancing justice, education, public health and independent media. The group's name was inspired by Karl Popper's 1945 book The Open Society and Its Enemies.

As of 2015, the OSF had branches in 37 countries, encompassing a group of country and regional foundations, such as the Open Society Initiative for West Africa, and the Open Society Initiative for Southern Africa; its headquarters are at 224 West 57th Street in New York City. In 2018, OSF announced it was closing its European office in Budapest and moving to Berlin, in response to legislation passed by the Hungarian government targeting the foundation's activities. As of 2021, OSF has reported expenditures in excess of $16 billion since its establishment in 1993, mostly in grants towards NGOs, aligned with the organisation's mission.

History
On May 28, 1984, business magnate George Soros signed a contract between the Soros Foundation (New York City) and the Hungarian Academy of Sciences, the founding document of the Soros Foundation Budapest. This was followed by several foundations in the region to help countries move away from Real socialism in the Eastern Bloc.

In 1993 open Society Institute was created in the United States to support the Soros foundations in Central and Eastern Europe and Russia.

In August 2010, it started using the name Open Society Foundations (OSF) to better reflect its role as a benefactor for civil society groups in countries around the world.

In 1995, Soros stated that he believed there can be no absolute answers to political questions because the same principle of reflexivity applies as in financial markets.

In 2012, Christopher Stone joined the OSF as the second president. He replaced Aryeh Neier, who served as president from 1993 to 2012. Stone announced in September 2017 that he was stepping down as president. In January 2018, Patrick Gaspard was appointed president of the Open Society Foundations. He announced in December 2020 that he was stepping down as president. In January 2021, Mark Malloch-Brown was appointed president of the Open Society Foundations.

In 2016, the OSF was reportedly the target of a cyber security breach. Documents and information reportedly belonging to the OSF were published by a website. The cyber security breach has been described as sharing similarities with Russian-linked cyberattacks that targeted other institutions, such as the Democratic National Committee.

In 2017, Soros transferred $18 billion to the Foundation.

In 2020, Soros announced that he was creating the Open Society University Network (OSUN), endowing the network with $1 billion.

Activities

The Library of Congress Soros Foundation Visiting Fellows Program was initiated in 1990.

Its $873 million budget in 2013, ranked as the second-largest private philanthropy budget in the United States, after the Bill and Melinda Gates Foundation budget of $3.9 billion. As of 2020, its budget increased to $1.2 billion.

The foundation reported granting at least $33 million to civil rights and social justice organizations in the United States. This funding included groups such as the Organization for Black Struggle and Missourians Organizing for Reform and Empowerment that supported protests in the wake of the killing of Trayvon Martin, the death of Eric Garner, the shooting of Tamir Rice and the shooting of Michael Brown. According to OpenSecrets, the OSF spends much of its resources on democratic causes around the world, and has also contributed to groups such as the Tides Foundation.

The OSF has been a major financial supporter of U.S. immigration reform, including establishing a pathway to citizenship for undocumented immigrants.

OSF projects have included the National Security and Human Rights Campaign and the Lindesmith Center, which conducted research on drug reform.

The OSF became a partner of the National Democratic Institute, a charitable organization which partnered with pro-democracy groups like the Gov2U project run by Scytl.

On January 23, 2020, the OSF announced a contribution of $1 billion from George Soros for the new Open Society University Network (OSUN), which network provides university courses, programs, and research through shared faculty, and for institutions needing international partners, to serve neglected student populations worldwide. The founding institutions were Bard College and Central European University.

In April 2022, OSF announced a grant of $20 million to The International Crisis Group in support of efforts to analyse global issues fuelling violence, climate injustice and economic inequality and providing recommendations to address them.

Reception
In 2007, Nicolas Guilhot (a senior research associate at the French National Centre for Scientific Research) wrote in Critical Sociology that the Open Society Foundations serve to perpetuate institutions that reinforce the existing social order, as the Ford Foundation and Rockefeller Foundation have done before them. Guilhot argues that control over the social sciences by moneyed interests has depoliticized this field and reinforced a capitalist view of modernization.

An OSF effort in 2008 in the African Great Lakes region aimed at spreading human rights awareness among prostitutes in Uganda and other nations in the area was not received well by the Ugandan authorities, who considered it an effort to legalize and legitimize prostitution.

Open Society Foundations has been criticized in pro-Israel editorials, Tablet magazine, Arutz Sheva and Jewish Press, for including funding for the activist groups Adalah and I'lam, which they say are anti-Israel and support the Boycott, Divestment and Sanctions movement. Among the documents released in 2016 by DCleaks, an OSF report reads "For a variety of reasons, we wanted to construct a diversified portfolio of grants dealing with Israel and Palestine, funding both Israeli Jewish and PCI (Palestinian Citizens of Israel) groups as well as building a portfolio of Palestinian grants and in all cases to maintain a low profile and relative distance—particularly on the advocacy front."

In 2013, NGO Monitor, an Israeli NGO, produced a report which says, "Soros has been a frequent critic of Israeli government policy, and does not consider himself a Zionist, but there is no evidence that he or his family holds any special hostility or opposition to the existence of the state of Israel. This report will show that their support, and that of the Open Society Foundations, has nevertheless gone to organizations with such agendas." The report says its objective is to inform the OSF, claiming: "The evidence demonstrates that Open Society funding contributes significantly to anti-Israel campaigns in three important respects:

 Active in the Durban strategy;
 Funding aimed at weakening United States support for Israel by shifting public opinion regarding the Israeli-Palestinian conflict and Iran;
 Funding for Israeli political opposition groups on the fringes of Israeli society, which use the rhetoric of human rights to advocate for marginal political goals."

The report concludes, "Yet, to what degree Soros, his family, and the Open Society Foundations are aware of the cumulative impact on Israel and of the political warfare conducted by many of their beneficiaries is an open question."

In November 2015, Russia banned the activities of the Open Society Foundations on its territory, declaring "It was found that the activity of the Open Society Foundations and the Open Society Institute Assistance Foundation represents a threat to the foundations of the constitutional system of the Russian Federation and the security of the state".

In 2017, Open Society Foundations and other NGOs which promote open government and help refugees were targeted for crackdowns by authoritarian and populist governments who have been emboldened by encouraging signals from the Trump Administration. Several politicians in eastern Europe, including Liviu Dragnea in Romania and right-wing figures Szilard Nemeth  in Hungary, North Macedonia's Nikola Gruevski, who called for a "de-Sorosization" of society, and Poland's Jarosław Kaczyński, who has said that Soros-funded groups want "societies without identity", regard many of the NGO groups to be irritants at best, and threats at worst. Some of those Soros-funded advocacy groups in the region said the renewed attacks were harassment and intimidation, which became more open after the 2016 election of Donald Trump in the United States. Stefania Kapronczay of the Hungarian Civil Liberties Union, which receives half of its funding from Soros-backed foundations, claimed that Hungarian officials are "testing the waters" in an effort to see "what they can get away with."

In 2017, the government of Pakistan ordered the Open Society Foundations to cease operations within the country.

In May 2018, Open Society Foundations announced they will move its office from Budapest to Berlin, amid Hungarian government interference.

In November 2018, Open Society Foundations announced they are ceasing operations in Turkey and closing their Istanbul and Ankara offices due to "false accusations and speculations beyond measure", amid pressure from Turkish government and governmental interference through detainment of Turkish intellectuals and liberal academics claimed to be associated with the foundation and related NGOs, associations and programmes.

See also
 Alliance for Open Society International
 Blinken Open Society Archives
 Budapest Open Access Initiative
 Central European University
 Colour revolution
 Directory of Open Access Journals
 Open society
 Open Society Foundations–Armenia
 Open Society Institute-Baltimore
 Transparency International
 Transparify

References

Further reading
 .
 .
 .
 .
 .
 .
 .
 
 Stone, Diana  (2013) Knowledge Actors and Transnational Governance: The Private-Public Policy Nexus in the Global Agora. Palgrave Macmillan

External links
 Open Society Foundations official website
 Blinken Open Society Archives

Civic organizations
George Soros
Non-profit technology
Political and economic research foundations in the United States
Organizations established in 1993
Global policy organizations
Grants (money)
Undesirable organizations in Russia